The Little capital derby  or the Little Sofia derby  is the name of the football match between PFC Lokomotiv Sofia and PFC Slavia Sofia. Slavia and Lokomotiv are the two most popular and successful football clubs in Sofia after PFC Levski Sofia and PFC CSKA Sofia (the match between Levski and CSKA is considered the biggest derby match in Bulgaria and the big capital derby)

Official match statistics

Head-to-head ranking in First League (1948–2022)

• Total: Slavia Sofia with 38 higher finishes, Lokomotiv Sofia with 29 higher finishes (as of the end of the 2021–22 season).

Trophies

Notes:
 Bulgarian Cup section includes Soviet Army Cup as major Cup tournament.
 Italics indicates defunct tournaments.

Statistics

Biggest wins

Slavia wins
5:0 - 1953/22/09 
5:1 - 1979/23/09

Lokomotiv wins
6:0 - 2000/27/05	 
5:1 -  1972/11/12

References

External links
Bulgaria Cups Overview - Bulgarian Cups, RSSSF.com
A pfg Stat, a-pfg.com

Football derbies in Bulgaria
FC Lokomotiv 1929 Sofia
PFC Slavia Sofia